The 2011 Ohio State Buckeyes football team represented Ohio State University in the 2011 NCAA Division I FBS football season. The Buckeyes were coached by Luke Fickell on an interim basis following the resignation of Jim Tressel as head coach. The Buckeyes played their home games at Ohio Stadium in Columbus, Ohio and are members of the Big Ten Conference in the Leaders Division. 

Amid significant adversity due to Tressel's abrupt departure and an NCAA investigation, the Buckeyes finished with their first non-winning season since 1999, at 6–7. They also finished 3–5 in the Big Ten, placing them fourth in the Leaders Division—only their sixth losing record in conference play since the end of World War II.   They lost the 2012 Gator Bowl to Florida, 24–17.

Before the season

Previous season
Expectations were high in 2010 as Jim Tressel and Ohio State started the season ranked #2 and poised for another National Championship run. With #1 Alabama losing to South Carolina, Ohio State was voted #1 on October 10, 2010. However, the Buckeyes were defeated by #16 Wisconsin on October 16, effectively ending their hopes at a national championship bid. The OSU football season finished with the team posting a 12–1 record, which includes a 38–10 victory over Indiana that gave Tressel his 100th win at Ohio State and a 31–26 victory over #8 Arkansas in the Sugar Bowl. 2010 resulted in a sixth straight conference title as well as securing a #5 final ranking.

The first five games of the season were played without the participation of five players: Terrelle Pryor, DeVier Posey, Mike Adams, Solomon Thomas, and Boom Herron. These players were part of a scandal that involved selling memorabilia to the owner of a Columbus tattoo parlor.  On March 8, 2011, it was reported that Tressel knew about it as early as April 2010 through an anonymous e-mail.  As of result, Tressel received a two-game suspension for failing to notify authorities of the players' wrongdoings.  Tressel later decided to sit out the first five games in order to allow him to face the adversity with the five players. On May 30, 2011, Tressel tendered his resignation from the head coaching position. Assistant head coach Luke Fickell, who was to take over during Tressel's suspension, was named interim head coach. On June 8, returning starting Quarterback Terrelle Pryor announced his intention to forgo his senior season, "in the best interest of [his] teammates," in light of his suspension and ongoing investigation by the NCAA.

2012 NFL Draft Class

Undrafted Seniors who signed with an NFL Team
Brandon Saine (Running back) – Green Bay Packers

Dane Sanzenbacher (Wide receiver) – Chicago Bears

Justin Boren (Offensive lineman) – Baltimore Ravens

Bryant Browning (Offensive lineman) – St. Louis Rams

Jake McQuaide (Long snapper) – St. Louis Rams

Dexter Larimore (Defensive Tackle) – New Orleans Saints

Devon Torrence (Cornerback) – Minnesota Vikings

Unsigned Seniors
5 Taurian Washington (Wide receiver)

8 Aaron Grant (Safety)

23 Devin Barclay (Kicker)

17 Grant Schwartz (Wide receiver)

55 Andy Miller (Offensive lineman)

57 Chris Malone (Offensive lineman)

72 Scott Sika (Offensive lineman)

73 Josh Kerr (Offensive lineman)

77 Connor Smith (Offensive lineman)

81 Ricky Crawford (Tight end)

89 Garrett Hummel (Tight end)

95 Don Matheney (Defensive lineman)

NFL Draft early entries
Terrelle Pryor – Junior Quarterback (NFL Supplemental Draft – Third Round to the Oakland Raiders)

Transfers out
Sam Longo – Redshirt Sophomore Offensive lineman (University of Cincinnati)

Dorian Bell – Redshirt Sophomore Linebacker (Duquesne University)

James Louis – Redshirt Freshman Wide receiver (Florida International University)

James Jackson – Redshirt Sophomore Wide receiver (Grand Valley State University)

Transfers in
None

Recruiting class

Schedule

Coaching staff
 Luke Fickell – Interim Head Coach (10th year on staff)
 Jim Bollman – Offensive line/OC (11th year)
 Nick Siciliano – Quarterbacks (3rd year)
 Jim Heacock – Defensive coordinator / defensive line (16th year)
 Paul Haynes – Defensive Safeties (7th year)
 Stan Drayton – Wide receivers (1st year)
 Taver Johnson – Defensive Cornerbacks (5th year)
 John Peterson – Tight ends Coach / Recruiting coordinator (8th year)
 Dick Tressel – Running backs (11th year)
 Mike Vrabel – Defensive linebackers
 Greg Gillum – Director of Football Operations (3rd year)
 Stan Jefferson – Director of Player Development (8th year)
 Eric Lichter – Director of Football Performance (6th year)
 Doug Davis – Strength Coordinator (5th year)
 Troy Sutton – Strength Coordinator (4th year)

Regular season

Akron

The first game of the Luke Fickell era began with an opening drive defensive stop and a touchdown run by starting quarterback Joe Bauserman.  Both teams struggled on offense through the first quarter, with the score only amounting to 7–0 Ohio State.  Midway through the second quarter, the Buckeyes put together a 12 play drive that resulted in a Bauserman to Jake Stoneburner touchdown pass, increasing the Buckeyes lead to 14–0.  Before the end of the half, Ohio State was able to score another touchdown on a Bauserman to Stoneburner pass, and going into halftime Ohio State led 21–0.  The heat throughout the game caused problems not only for the players, but also for the referees, band members, and fans in attendance with temperatures reaching almost 100 °F.  The second half saw another big offensive start with the third touchdown pass from Bauserman to Stoneburner, advancing the Buckeyes lead to 28–0.  Throughout the rest of the second half, freshman Braxton Miller took most of the offensive snaps at quarterback, compiling 1 touchdown pass along with 130 yard, compared to Bauserman's 163.  Ohio State won the game 42–0, their first shutout since October 23, 2010 against Purdue.  Ohio State opened their 2011 season 1–0, and giving Fickell his first win as the Ohio State head coach.

Toledo

Ohio State continued their 2011 season with a home match up against in-state foe Toledo.  The game started out well for the Buckeyes, as it did with Akron the week before.  Joe Bauserman completed a touchdown pass to Jake Stoneburner, his fourth touchdown reception of the year, and Ohio State quickly went up 7–0.  However, throughout the rest of the first quarter, Toledo would dominate, with a blocked punt and an eventual touchdown resulting.  (This touchdown would be the first points Toledo scored against Ohio State in three games.)  A 66-yard reception by Eric Page allowed Toledo to take a 15–7 lead heading into the second quarter.  Toledo committed 14 penalties on the day for 109 yard, allowing Ohio State to make big plays resulting and capitalize on plays which were broken up.  Heading into the second quarter, Ohio State received the momentum back from Toledo, with a 36 touchdown run from Carlos Hyde and a 45-yard punt return from Chris Fields.  After a sloppy first half by both teams, Ohio State went into halftime with a 21–15 lead.  Ohio State again started off the second half slow, allowing the Rockets to score a touchdown on their opening drive of the half, and allowing them to take the lead again, 22–21.  The one-point Toledo lead held up for most of the third quarter, until another touchdown run by Hyde, and a subsequently missed two-point conversion, gave Ohio State a five-point, 27–22 lead.  No more scoring took place during the rest of the game for both teams, with a defensive battle ensuing in the fourth quarter.  The game came down to a final play, with a Toledo fourth and six on the Ohio State 17.  Terrance Owens was unable to complete the pass, coming five yards short and the Buckeyes were able to escape with a victory, allowing them to go 2–0 on the season.

Miami (Florida)

Ohio State's first road game of the season took them to south Florida for a rematch against the Miami Hurricanes who they faced in the 2010 season, as well as the 2003 Fiesta Bowl, beating them both times.  The game did not start well for the Buckeyes, with a bad opening offensive drive, giving Miami good field position.  The Hurricanes quickly drove down the field 63 yards and scored their first points of the game on a Jacory Harris touchdown pass.  Later in the quarter, Miami again drove down the field for another Harris touchdown pass, giving the Hurricanes a 14–0 lead at the end of the first quarter.  The second quarter saw the momentum swing in favor of Ohio State, with two drives heading deep into Miami territory, however, once in the red zone, the Buckeyes were unable to capitalize and had to settle for two short range field goals by Drew Basil, bringing them closer in the games and giving Miami only a 14–6 lead.  However a field goal at the end of the first half gave Miami a two-possession lead heading into halftime.  The second half of the game saw little offense, with both the Buckeyes' defense dominating the Hurricanes and keeping them out of Ohio State territory, as well at the Buckeye offense continuing to struggle to get any kind of rhythm.  Miami was able to score a touchdown with 0:33 remaining in the game, giving them a 24–6 lead—the final score of the game.  The game was the first non-conference loss since the September 12, 2009 loss against the University of Southern California.

Colorado

Ohio State came off their previous week's loss to Miami with a home game against the Colorado Buffaloes.  For the first time during the season, freshman quarterback Braxton Miller received the start, only the third time Ohio State started a freshman at that position.  The second offensive drive of the first quarter saw the Buckeyes move the ball 43 yards down the field and score on a Jordan Hall touchdown run.  A Drew Basil field goal later on in the quarter gave Ohio State a 10–0 lead early on in the game.  Colorado's special teams, as well as the number of penalties which they drew, allowed Ohio State to have relatively good field position throughout the game, averaging a start around their 50-yard line.  Ohio State took advantage of the field position with a touchdown pass from Miller to Devin Smith, giving Ohio State a 17–0 lead.  Colorado eventually drove down the field on their next possession and scored on an 11-yard touchdown reception, narrowing the score to 17–7.  A field goal before the end of the half allowed Ohio State to go into the locker room with a 20–7 lead.  The third quarter saw a back and forth between the both teams, with Ohio State still dominating.  Another Miller to Smith touchdown reception put Ohio State up 27–7, while Colorado continued to stay in the game with an Oliver field goal.  Basil would kick a field goal to end the third quarter, as well as starting the fourth, and gave Ohio State a 37–10 lead late in the game.  A late Colorado touchdown was the last score of the game, as the favored Buckeyes beat Colorado 37–17, rebounding after their previous week's loss to Miami, as Ohio State moved to 3–1 on the season.

Michigan State

On a cold rainy day in Columbus, Ohio, the Ohio State Buckeyes opened their 2011 Big Ten Conference campaign against the Michigan State Spartans.  Both teams were unable to score on their opening possessions of the ballgame. Michigan State opened the scoring with a 33-yard pass from Kirk Cousins to B.J. Cunningham, giving the Spartans a 7–0 lead. Throughout the first quarter both teams would trade field position as both defenses stepped up to the occasion to stop the opposing team.  Michigan State found themselves deep in Ohio State territory late in the second quarter, however, an interception by Cousins, one of three Michigan State turnovers on the day, would allow Ohio State to enter halftime only down by a score of 7–0.  The rain and windy conditions made the game much more of a defensive battle than expected.  Throughout the third quarter and the rest of the second half, both teams continued to trade field position and come up with stops on defense.  A missed 51-yard field goal by Dan Conroy allowed the Buckeyes and their struggling offense to have a shot at tying the game, however, with Joe Bauserman replacing Braxton Miller at QB, Ohio State was unable to move the ball.  Michigan State extended their lead by 3 with a 50-yard field goal from Conroy, giving the Spartans a 10–0 advantage.  A late touchdown by the Buckeyes would do little to help their effort as Ohio State went on to lose the game 10–7.  This was Ohio State's first 0–1 start in Big Ten play since 2004, as well as their first loss to Michigan State since 1999.

Nebraska

In the first match up between the Buckeyes and Cornhuskers since the 1950s, Ohio State went into Lincoln hoping to win and rebound after their previous week's loss to Michigan State.  Ohio State struggling offense came out with some fire, driving down the field on their first drive for a Drew Basil field goal, giving Ohio State an early 3–0.  With Nebraska kicking a field goal a few minutes later, the game was tied midway through the first quarter at 3–3.  A Braxton Miller to Jake Stoneburner touchdown at the end of the quarter gave Ohio State a 10–3 lead and the momentum.  The second quarter continued the Ohio State dominance with a 63-yard touchdown run from Carlos Hyde and an exchange of field goals between the two teams, allowing the Buckeyes to go into halftime with a 20–6 lead.  The second half of the game began very well for the Buckeyes with another Hyde touchdown, giving Ohio State their largest lead at 27–6.  However, a Braxton Miller fumble, which allowed Nebraska to score their first touchdown of the game in the third quarter, as well as an ankle injury by Miller, eventually gave the Cornhuskers the momentum back down the stretch of the game.  Another Nebraska touchdown at the end of the third quarter allowed the Cornhuskers to cut it to a 7-point game, 27–20, going into the fourth quarter.  Two fourth-quarter touchdowns, both by Rex Burkhead, allowed Nebraska to receive their first lead of the night, pushing them to the victory, and the largest comeback in school history.  With the loss, Ohio State dropped to 3–3 and 0–2 in the Big Ten for the first time since the 1988 season.

Illinois

Ohio State came into the season match up with the undefeated Illinois Fighting Illini coming off two consecutive losses for the first time since the 2004 season.  As with the last game against Nebraska, Ohio State opened the game with a primarily running attack on their first drive, with the return of star running back Dan Herron from suspension.  Ohio State began the game with a Drew Basil 43-yard field goal, giving them a 3–0 lead.  Throughout the rest of the first half, both teams would exchange field position and punts with no more scoring or offensive production coming from either team.  Going into halftime, Ohio State still held a 3–0 lead, with Illinois receiving the ball first in the second half. An interception by Ohio State early on in the third quarter, set up Ohio State inside the Illinois red-zone, and the eventual Herron touchdown.  After no more scoring throughout the third quarter, Ohio State went into the fourth quarter with only a 10–0 lead.  An early touchdown pass from Braxton Miller to Jake Stoneburner gave Ohio State their largest lead at 17–0.  Following the touchdown, a very long, 16 play drive by Illinois, which resulted in a touchdown, ended the Ohio State shutout thus far, and put Illinois back in the game.  A few defensive stops, coupled with the offense running down the clock, clinched the victory for the Buckeyes.  With the victory, Ohio State moved to 4–3 on the season and 1–2 in the Big Ten, their first Big Ten victory of the season.

Wisconsin

Ohio State entered their 2011 homecoming game following a bye week, with their opponent being the Wisconsin Badgers, who were the only team to defeat the Buckeyes in the 2010 season.  The game opened with neither team scoring on their opening possession.  Wisconsin's high-powered run-and-pass attack struck first midway through the first quarter with a touchdown reception from Montee Ball giving Wisconsin an early 7–0 lead.  Led on many parts by the mistakes of the Badgers, the Buckeyes were able to penetrate Wisconsin's side of the field, especially late in the second quarter, where a Drew Basil field goal cut the Wisconsin lead to 7–3 going into halftime.  With the opening of the third quarter, Braxton Miller and the Ohio State offense were able to drive down the field, capped off with a 1-yard touchdown run from Miller, which gave the Buckeyes their first lead of the night at 10–7.  After a Wisconsin blocked punt on their next possession, Ohio State was able to drive the ball into the end zone again with a Jordan Hall two-yard run and gave Ohio State a 17–7 lead.  Wisconsin quickly responded with the next drive and the ensuing touchdown from Ball, his second on the day, cut the game back down to a 17–14 affair.  Ohio State held the lead going into the fourth quarter and quickly was able to increase their lead with another Basil field goal.  As the quarter quickly ticked away, Miller was able to break away on a quarterback run and go in for the touchdown.  With the failed two-point conversion, Ohio State firmly held a 26–14 lead with a little under five minutes remaining in the game.  Wisconsin quickly drove down the field to score a touchdown in only 0:58 cutting the Ohio State lead to 26–21.  With Ohio State unproductive on their ensuing possession, Wisconsin received the ball back and again drove down the field quickly to score, in only 1:18, with their two-point conversion good.  Ohio State trailed 29–26, and with a short field to work with, Miller and the offense took the field.  With a little under forty seconds remaining in the game, Miller completed a 40-yard touchdown pass Devin Smith, and sealed the victory for Ohio State.  With the win, the Buckeyes put themselves into position to earn a trip to the inaugural Big Ten championship game and moved to 2–2 in the Big Ten, after starting 0–2.

Indiana

After the Buckeyes victory of Wisconsin, Ohio State remained at home to face an intra-divisional team in the Indiana Hoosiers.  Ohio State began the game slowly, allowing an Indiana field goal, quickly followed by a five-yard touchdown run within the first ten minutes of the game, giving the Hoosiers a 10–0 lead.  On the next possession, Braxton Miller quickly cut down the Indiana lead with an 81-yard touchdown run, one of the longest by runs by a quarterback in Ohio State history.  Heading into the second quarter Indiana still held a 10–7, however two Drew Basil field goals allowed the Buckeyes to take their first lead of the day at 13–10.  With 4:30 remaining in the first half, Indiana was able to capitalize and kick a 25-yard field goal, tying the game at 13–13 going into halftime.  Dan Herron made his presence known again in the game quickly to start the third quarter with a 15-yard touchdown run, giving Ohio State the lead back at 20–13.  However, the back-and-forth match continued at Indiana drove down the field to score a touchdown in response on a Robertson to Hughes reception.  Another Miller touchdown run would give Ohio State the 27–20 lead going into the fourth quarter, as well as the momentum.  Led by the defense, Ohio State was able to rally in the fourth quarter and allowed Ohio State the get the sealing touchdown with a little over two minutes remaining in the game, which gave the Buckeyes the 34–20 lead and improved their record to 6–3 on the season.

Purdue

In their first visit to West Lafayette since their 2009 loss, the Buckeyes looked for their fourth straight win and first at Ross–Ade Stadium since 2007.  The game started for the Buckeyes like the previous week's match up versus Indiana.  A 19-yard field goal from Wiggs and four-yard touchdown run gave Purdue a 10–0 lead which they held through the entirety of the first quarter.  A 38-yard touchdown reception from Miller to Hall gave the Buckeyes some offensive spark as they cut the score down to 10–7.  However, another Purdue touchdown would give Purdue a commanding 17–7 lead with 3:19 left in the second quarter, a lead which they would take into halftime.  With the Ohio State defense making crucial stops in the second half, Ohio State was able to get the ball back and score on their first possession in the second half with a 6-yard Braxton Miller touchdown run, giving Purdue now only a 17–14 lead.  While both teams struggled with their offense, it would be Purdue who added to their lead with a 44-yard field goal, and extending their lead to 20–14.  Ohio State was not able to get close to a score for most of the fourth quarter, however a long drive at the end of the quarter saw a Miller pass to Hall for a touchdown, tying the game at 20–20.  However, with a Drew Basil blocked extra point, the game remained tied and headed into overtime.  The Ohio State offense continued to struggle on their overtime possession only able to come up with a field goal, which gave them their first lead of the game at 23–20.  The Buckeyes defense, taking the field next was unable to stop the Purdue running attack and eventually allowed a touchdown from the one-yard line to end the game and give the Boilermakers the 26–23 win.  With the loss, Ohio State dropped to 6–4, losing at least four games in a season for the first time since 2004, and making the road to the Big Ten Championship Game much harder if not impossible with a 3–3 Big Ten record.

Penn State

Ohio State entered their 2011 senior day with a 6–4 record, facing a Penn State Nittany Lions team with aspirations of the Big Ten Championship Game.  In the same fashion of the previous two games, Ohio State fell behind quickly in the game facing a 10–0 deficit following an early Stephfon Green touchdown run and a 43-yard field goal from Anthony Fera.  Heading into the second quarter, Ohio State put together their first extended drive of the game, ending in a Braxton Miller 24-yard touchdown run cutting the Penn State lead to a 10–7 affair.  Penn State returned the favor with a quick drive ending with another Green touchdown run, giving the Nittany Lions the 17–7 advantage midway through the second quarter.  Later in the quarter, Ohio State was able to put together their second scoring drive of the game which consisted of only five plays and ended in a Jake Stoneburner touchdown reception.  Penn State, however, was able to use the rest of the second quarter clock on a drive which put them into field goal position, Fera's 46-yard field goal was good, and allowed them to go into halftime with a 20–14, the eventual final score of the game.  The second half was marred for Ohio State with the defense able to stop the Nittany Lions on the one-yard line four times for a goal line stand, but also of two costly fumbles which would end an hope of a comeback drive.  The last two quarters of the game saw no scoring and allowed Penn State to exit Ohio Stadium with the 20–14 win, their first win at Ohio State since 2008, bringing Ohio State's overall record to 6–5 on the season, and 3–4 in conference play.

Michigan

Ohio State finished its conference slate with a loss to the Wolverines under first year head coach and Ohio native Brady Hoke. The loss saw the Buckeyes' 7-year winning streak against their arch-rivals come to an end.

2012 Gator Bowl

The game featured Urban Meyer's former school (Florida) versus the school (Ohio State) he was about to take over as head coach.

Rankings

Roster

2012 NFL Draft

References

Ohio State
Ohio State Buckeyes football seasons
Ohio State Buckeyes football